San Joaquín is a station along Line 7 of the metro of Mexico City.

Its logo represents the silhouette of one of the bridges of the radial Viaducto Río San Joaquín.

It was opened on 20 December 1984.

It is located in the Colonia Pensil Sur neighborhood and nearby points of interest include the Panteón Francés.

Ridership

Exits
West: Lago Hielmar and Lago Ginebra, Colonia Pencil Sur
East: Lago Hielmar and Lago Ginebra, Colonia Pencil Sur

Gallery

References

External links
 

San Joaquin
Railway stations opened in 1984
1984 establishments in Mexico
Mexico City Metro stations in Miguel Hidalgo, Mexico City
Accessible Mexico City Metro stations